A list of British films released in 2007.

2007

See also
 2007 in film
 2007 in British music
 2007 in British radio
 2007 in British television
 2007 in the United Kingdom
 List of 2007 box office number-one films in the United Kingdom

References

External links

2007
Films
British